Thoracopterus is an extinct genus of overwater gliding ray-finned fish. It was common to the late Middle Triassic and Late Triassic epochs in what is now Europe and China.

Thoracopterus had elongate pectoral fins, similar to modern Exocoetidae, which are used to glide overwater in order to escape aquatic predators. Thoracopterus represents the earliest known example for overwater gliding in actinopterygians.

References

 Fishes of the World by Joseph S. Nelson (page 95)
 Wildlife of Gondwana: Dinosaurs and Other Vertebrates from the Ancient Supercontinent (Life of the Past) by Pat Vickers Rich, Thomas Hewitt Rich, Francesco Coffa, and Steven Morton
 The Rise of Fishes: 500 Million Years of Evolution by John A. Long

Peltopleuriformes
Triassic fish of Asia
Triassic fish of Europe
Taxa named by Heinrich Georg Bronn